Lithium iridate, Li2IrO3, is a chemical compound of lithium, iridium and oxygen. It forms black crystals with three slightly different layered atomic structures, α, β, and sometimes γ. Lithium iridate exhibits metal-like, temperature-independent electrical conductivity, and changes its magnetic ordering from paramagnetic to antiferromagnetic upon cooling to 15 K.

Structure
Li2IrO3 typically crystallizes in the α or β phase, and a rare γ phase has been reported. The crystal structure of α-Li2IrO3 consists of an alternate stacking of hexagonal Li layers and honeycombs of edge-sharing IrO6 octahedra with Li in the center. The offset in adjacent layers results in a relatively low (monoclinic) crystal symmetry. Li2IrO3 crystals have abundant twinning defects where the ab crystal planes are rotated by 120° around the c axis.

Synthesis
 

Li2IrO3 crystals can be grown by direct sintering of Ir and Li metals, which both oxidize during heating in ambient atmosphere. The α phase is formed at 750–1050 °C, while heating to higher temperatures results in the β phase. The use of Li metal instead of more traditional lithium carbonate, which is easier to handle and store, results in larger crystals. The γ phase can be obtained by the calcination of lithium carbonate and iridium(IV) oxide, followed by annealing in molten lithium hydroxide at 700–800 °C.

Properties
Lithium iridate is black in color and has a relatively high, temperature-independent electrical conductivity characteristic of metals. Its both α and β phases exhibit the Kitaev exchange coupling between magnetic spins originating from Ir4+ ions. These spins form an antiferromagnetic lattice at temperatures below 15 K (Néel temperature, TN), while the material is paramagnetic above TN.

Potential applications
Lithium iridate is a potential electrode material for the lithium-ion battery. This application is hindered by the high costs of Ir, as compared to the cheaper Li2MnO3 alternative.

References

Lithium compounds
Iridium compounds
Transition metal oxyanions
Oxometallates